The People's Solidarity Movement of Afghanistan (Feda'ian) was a political party in Afghanistan. It was led by Safar Muhammad Khadem.

References

Communist parties in Afghanistan
Defunct political parties in Afghanistan
Socialist parties in Afghanistan